Bal Bramhachari is a 1996 Indian Action Romantic Drama film. The Producer and Director of film is Prakash Mehra. Puru Raaj Kumar and  Karisma Kapoor is in lead role. With this film Puru Raaj Kumar (Son of Raaj Kumar) make debut in Bollywood started his acting career.

Plot
Thakur Raghuveer Singh and his wife have no children, and there is no hope of getting a child. Thakur Raghuveer Singh donates a huge plot of land to his friend Professor Vijay Thripati to fulfil his friend's dream to build a college. As Raghuveer Singh yearns to have a child and the professor and his wife ask him to adopt their son. Bhujbal Choudary is not happy because Thakur Raghuveer Singh donated his land to his friend Professor Vijay Thripati enraged as he wants to build a factory instead of a college. To churn out the students from the college, he arranges fake diplomas that have no meaning as an anti-social activity. Then he plans to kill the professor and his wife on the day the foundation stone is being laid for the college. The professor is killed; however his wife manages to escape and take shelter in a Hanuman Mandir there, she gives birth to a son in Hanuman temple. On the request of the dying mother, the priest hands over the baby boy to Thakur Raghuveer Singh. Thakur has already decided to adopt Balak Ram's son named Balbir, so later, he adopts both the children. Balak Ram, who has an evil eye on the Raghuveer Singh property and wants to acquire it as well as wants to kill Professor Vijay Thripati's son named Mahavir Singh, also adopted by Thakur.

Mahavir is specially blessed by Bhagwan Bajrangbali and possesses special powers, and he devotes god Hanuman. Thakur's adopted son studies in the same college run by Bhujbal Chowdary. While in college, Balbir meets with Seema and falls in love with her. Seema's friend, Asha Rana, is attracted to Mahavir, but Mahavir has taken a vow of celibacy 'brahmachari', and does not like any woman to come near to him. But Asha tries all of her seductive powers to make Mahavir change his mind. Eventually, Mahavir falls in love with Asha and decides to tie the knot. He also learns of his birth father and his dream. And then takes revenge against their attacker, in a shadowy form that he has magically seen in his dreams.

Cast
 Puru Raaj Kumar as Mahavir Singh/Pawan
 Karishma Kapoor as Asha Rana
 Mukesh Khanna as Thakur Raghuvir Singh
 Anang Desai as Professor Vijay Tripathy
 Aparajita as Anju Tripathy
 Deepak Tijori as Balbir
 Tinnu Anand as Balak Ram
 Mohan Joshi as Bhujbal Choudhury
 Shakti Kapoor as Chhote Choudhury
 Simran as Seema Choudhury
 Avtar Gill as Principal Rana
 Ashok Saraf  as Pyare Mohan
 Bindu as Professor Monica
 Himani Shivpuri as Shanti

Box office
Bal Bramhachari was released on 6 September 1996 and grossed Box office collection was estimate 4.57 crore against the budget of 2 crore.

Music
There are 06 songs in the Movie and all the music are composed by  Bappi Lahiri and the lyrics are written by Prakash Mehra

References

External links
 
 
 ''Bal Bramhachari at Bollywood Hungama

1996 drama films
1996 films
1990s action drama films
Films scored by Bappi Lahiri
Indian romantic action films
Indian action drama films
1990s Hindi-language films